Mvouni is a town located on the island of Grande Comore in the Comoros. It is located 6.9 kilometers from the country's capital, Moroni.

Populated places in Grande Comore